God's Spy (Espía de Dios in Spanish) is a bestselling thriller novel by Juan Gómez-Jurado originally published in Spain in 2006, and in English in 2007. It has become an instant bestseller throughout Europe with a million copies sold to date and is going to be published in 42 countries. The plot is set in the Vatican, where, in the aftermath of Pope John Paul II's death, the hunt for a serial killer and sex offender — and former priest — reveals a chilling conspiracy. It is a detective story where the psychological portrait of Victor Karosky, the serial killer (whose name is known from the first line of the book) is the spine of the novel. The action also takes place in a Maryland institution called the Saint Matthew Institute, a center for the rehabilitation of priest with a history of sexual abuse, which is based on a real-life place. This subject has aroused controversial issues in Catholic countries as Spain and Poland.

Summary

From the book cover: In the days following the Pope's death, a cardinal is found brutally murdered in a chapel in Rome, his eyes gouged and his hands cut off. Called in for the grisly case, police inspector Paola Dicanti learns that another cardinal was recently found dead; he had also been tortured. Desperate to find the killer before another victim dies, Paola's investigation is soon joined by Father Anthony Fowler — an American priest and former Army intelligence officer examining sexual abuse in the Church, who knows far more about the killer than Paola could possibly imagine.

Characters
Paola Dicanti — The leading character, a police inspector and profiler.
Father Victor Karosky— A pedophile priest, now a serial killer.
Maurizio Pontiero — Paola's partner.
Fabio Dante — Deputy inspector at Vatican Police.
Carlo Boi — Paola's boss.
Father Anthony Fowler— A mysterious priest.
Andrea Otero— A Spanish journalist.
Angelo Biffi— forensic sculptor and digital image expert.
Camilo Cirin— General inspector at Vatican Police.
Canice Conroy— Former director of the Saint Matthew Institute.

There is also a number of minor, real life characters, e.g. George W. Bush, John Negroponte, John Paul II, Benedict XVI and many others.

Book information
God's Spy by Juan Gómez-Jurado
Hardcover -  (First edition, April 5, 2007) published by Dutton (a Penguin Group imprint)

References

External links 
 Official site
 Author site

2007 novels
Novels set in Rome
Novels set in Vatican City
American thriller novels